Georg von Opel (born May 1966) is a German-born Swiss billionaire and heir, great-grandson of Adam Opel who founded the German car manufacturer Opel AG.

Early life 
Georg von Opel is the son of Georg Friedrich Karl Adam von Opel who was the son of Carl von Opel. He studied economics and business administration at the University of Rhode Island and the American InterContinental University, London.

Career
In April 2015, the Sunday Times Rich List estimated his net worth at GBP £1.3 billion. According to the Sunday Times Rich List, this had increased to £1.654 billion in 2020. His wealth primarily comes from Hansa AG, a holding company that invests in listed equities and private-equity funds. von Opel's real estate portfolio includes properties in the south of England, Majorca and the Engadin region in the Swiss Alps.

Donations 
von Opel is a major donor to the UK's Conservative Party. Through his foundation, the Georg and Emily von Opel Foundation, he has financially supported Oxford professor Sunetra Gupta who has argued against societal restrictions during the Covid-19 pandemic and was one of the authors of the Great Barrington Declaration.

Personal life
Opel and his British-born wife Emily have five children, and live in London, England. Opel was born a German citizen, became a Swiss resident in 1973, and a Swiss citizen in 2014.

References

Living people
1966 births
German emigrants to Switzerland
German corporate directors
German billionaires
Swiss billionaires
Georg
Conservative Party (UK) donors
20th-century German businesspeople
21st-century German businesspeople